The painted quail-thrush (Cinclosoma ajax) is a species of bird in the family Cinclosomatidae.
It is found in New Guinea.
Its natural habitat is subtropical or tropical moist lowland forest.

References

painted quail-thrush
Birds of New Guinea
painted quail-thrush
Taxonomy articles created by Polbot